Álvaro Alfredo Alejandro Madrid Gaete (born 5 April 1995) is a Chilean footballer who plays for Everton.

References

1995 births
Living people
Chilean footballers
Chilean Primera División players
Everton de Viña del Mar footballers
Unión La Calera footballers
Association football midfielders